Round About is a public art work by artist Linda Howard located in Milwaukee, Wisconsin at the Lynden Sculpture Garden. The abstract sculpture consists of aluminum bars stacked horizontally; it is installed on the lawn.

See also
 Sky Fence

References

1976 sculptures
1976 establishments in Wisconsin
Aluminum sculptures in Wisconsin
Abstract sculptures in Wisconsin
Outdoor sculptures in Milwaukee